The 1915–16 season was Galatasaray SK's 12th in existence and the club's 8th consecutive season in the IFL.

Squad statistics

Competitions

İstanbul Football League

Standings

Matches

Fukaraperver Hanımlar Cemiyeti Kupası

Kick-off listed in local time (EEST)

References
 Futbol, Galatasaray. Tercüman Spor Ansiklopedisi vol.2 (1981) (page 556)
 1915-1916 İstanbul Cuma Ligi. Türk Futbol Tarihi vol.1. page(41). (June 1992) Türkiye Futbol Federasyonu Yayınları. 
 Tuncay, Bülent (2002). Galatasaray Tarihi. Page (115) Yapı Kredi Yayınları

External links
 Galatasaray Sports Club Official Website 
 Turkish Football Federation - Galatasaray A.Ş. 
 uefa.com - Galatasaray AŞ

Galatasaray S.K. (football) seasons
Turkish football clubs 1915–16 season
1910s in Istanbul